This is a list of diplomatic missions in Brunei.  Bandar Seri Begawan, the capital, hosts 29 embassies. Several other countries and the European Commission have diplomatic missions accredited from other capitals.

History

Until 1984, Brunei was a British protectorate, with international representation being the responsibility of the United Kingdom, which was represented by a High Commissioner, and before 1959, by a Resident, responsible for defence and external affairs. Shortly before full independence, other countries began opening missions in Brunei, with Malaysia opening a Government Agency in 1982, which was later upgraded to a Commission, along with its Singapore counterpart. Following independence and Brunei joining the Commonwealth, these became known as High Commissions. Similarly, the United States Consulate-General, established shortly before independence in December 1983, became the United States Embassy.

Embassies/High Commissions
Bandar Seri Begawan

Missions
 (Taipei Economic and Cultural Office in Brunei Darussalam)

Gallery

Non-resident embassies
Resident in Beijing, China:

 
 
 
 
 
 
 
 
 

Resident in Jakarta, Indonesia:

 
 
 
 

 
 
 
 
 
 
 

 
 

Resident in Kuala Lumpur, Malaysia:

 

 

 

Resident in Singapore:

 
 

 

 
 

 
 

Resident in Seoul, South Korea:

 
 
 

Resident in Tokyo, Japan:

 
 
 
 
 

 
 
 
 

Resident elsewhere:

 (New Delhi)
 (Riyadh)
 (New Delhi)
 (New York City)
 (Bangkok)
 (New Delhi)
 (Majuro)
 (Riyadh)
 (Manila)
 (Manila)
 (Dili)
 (Canberra)

See also 
List of diplomatic missions of Brunei
Visa requirements for Bruneian citizens

References
Diplomatic missions in Brunei Darussalam

Brunei Darussalam
Diplomatic missions